Tunisia, participated at the 1965 All-Africa Games held in Brazzaville, Congo. She won 12 medals.

Medal summary

Medal table

See also
 Tunisia at the All-Africa Games

References

Nations at the 1965 All-Africa Games
1965
1965 in Tunisian sport